Volta is an experimental developer toolset for building multi-tier web applications, developed at Microsoft Live Labs. It allows developers to split their application easily into different client and server parts throughout the development lifecycle. Volta integrates with Microsoft Visual Studio and the .NET Framework, supporting AJAX, JSON and more. It extends the .NET platform to software as a service (SaaS) applications, by using existing and familiar libraries, languages, tools, and techniques.

On September 8, 2008, Microsoft took the project page offline, "while we make a few changes."  Despite assurances on the page that "the technology will be available again soon", it has not yet returned. While continuing to make the software publicly unavailable, Microsoft Research has published an academic paper dated November 18, 2008 based on a framework built entirely on top of Volta.

See also
IL2JS - similar research project allowing running .NET languages directly in webbrowser using JavaScript
Google Web Toolkit a released Google product that accomplish the same goals using Java
Rich Internet application
Windows Live

References

Volta
Beta software